"Codex Monacensis" may refer to any manuscript held by the Bavarian State Library.

Codex Monacensis, designated by X or 033 (in the Gregory-Aland numbering of New Testament manuscripts), A (in the von Soden numbering of New Testament manuscripts), is a Greek uncial manuscript of the four Gospels written on parchment. The manuscript contains commentary from several church fathers. Using the study of comparative writing styles (palaeography), it has been dated to the 9th or 10th century. The manuscript has several gaps, and has been rebound at least once.

It is a witness to the passage of John 7:53-8:11 being omitted.

Description 
The manuscript is a codex (precursor to the modern book), containing the text of the four Gospels written on 160 thick parchment leaves in brown ink. It however has survived in a fragmentary condition, with several leaves from the Gospels of Matthew and Mark missing. The text was written in two columns, 45 lines per page, in small, upright uncial letters, by a "very elegant" hand, with breathing marks, accents and some compressed letters. The codex contains the four Gospels in the order of: John, Luke, Mark and Matthew, though the original order was Matthew, John, Luke and Mark, named the "Western Order". According to Biblical scholar Caspar René Gregory, "The bookbinder messed everything up".

The text of the Gospels contains a patristic commentary (except for Mark) written in minuscule letters. The commentary in Matthew and John is from the writings of John Chrysostom, and for some of Luke it is from Pseudo-Titus of Bostra. Though most of the commentary in Luke is between the verses, on the reverse side of folio 71 and both sides of folio 72, the commentary (from Origen and other early writers) has been written around the text in later hand to the original.

There are no divisions such as titles (known as  / titloi), and the Ammonian sections and Eusebian Canons (both early systems of dividing the Gospels into sections) are absent. The texts of Matthew 16:2b–3 and John 7:53-8:11 are omitted, though the Gospel of Mark has the longer ending.

 Contents
 Gospel of Matthew 6:6, 10, 11, 7:1-9:20, 9:34-11:24, 12:9-16:28, 17:14-18:25, 19:22-21:13, 21:28-22:22, 23:27-24:2, 24:23-35, 25:1-30, 26:69-27:12,
 Gospel of John 1:1-3:8, 4:6-5:42, 7:1-13:5, 13:20-15:25, 16:23-end,
 Gospel of Luke 1:1-37, 2:19-3:38, 4:21-10:37, 11:1-18:43, 20:46-end,
 Gospel of Mark 6:46-end (some parts of Mark 14-16 are illegible).

Text 

The Greek text of this codex is considered a representative of the Byzantine text-type, with occasional readings deemed to be from the Alexandrian text-type. Textual critic Kurt Aland placed it in Category V of his New Testament manuscript classification system. Category V manuscripts are described as "manuscripts with a purely or predominantly Byzantine text."

 Some notable readings

  (for everyone shall be seasoned by fire-salt) - X (singular reading)
  (for everyone shall be seasoned with fire) - Majority of manuscripts

  (and father and mother) - X  C K M Π 218 220 482
  (and mothers) - Majority of manuscripts

  (but [of the] living) - X  A B C D F K U Δ Π others
  (but God [of the] living) - Majority of manuscripts

History 
The codex was examined by Joseph Dobrovsky, who collated some of its readings for textual critic Johann Jakob Griesbach. Biblical scholar Johann M. A. Scholz collated it again, however the collation was considered poor. Biblical scholar  Constantin von Tischendorf collated its text again in 1844, and again by biblical scholar Samuel Prideaux Tregelles in 1846. Burgon examined the manuscript in 1872.

The codex was held in Innsbruck in 1757. It has been in Rome, Ingolstadt (as a present from Gerard Vossius (1577–1649)), and in 1827 it arrived in Munich. The manuscript is currently located in the Munich University Library (fol. 30), in Munich.

See also 

 List of New Testament uncials
 Textual criticism

References

External links 

 R. Waltz, Codex Monacensis X (033): at the Encyclopedia of Textual Criticism.
 Images of the manuscript online at the CSNTM.
 Cim. 16 (= 2° Cod. ms. 30): Full digital copy at Ludwig Maximillians Universitat Muchen Open Access University Library.

Greek New Testament uncials
9th-century biblical manuscripts